White Fence (also known by the acronym WF) is a predominantly Mexican American street gang in the Boyle Heights neighborhood of East Los Angeles.

History 
White Fence is one of the oldest gangs in Los Angeles. The gang itself claims its history goes back as far as 1900, although the gang did not emerge until the 1910s in the form of the all-male sports team associated with the La Purissima Church. The group was originally referred to as La Purissima Crowd, but gradually changed its name to White Fence, after the white picket fence that surrounded La Purissima Church.  The gang's name has also been interpreted as a "symbolic barrier" between the white residents in the area and the Hispanic residents of the neighborhood, at a time when racism plagued the area. During the 1950s and 1960s, White Fence was considered one of the "most violent and powerful gangs in East Los Angeles." The rivalry between the gang and another Hispanic gang, El Hoyo Maravilla, is one of the longest, ongoing feuds in all of Los Angeles, a rivalry going back to the 1930s. White Fence was the first gang in East Los Angeles to use firearms, chains and other dangerous weapons.

White Fence is an old established gang territory in Boyle Heights adjoined to East Los Angeles.

References

Organizations established in the 1910s
1910s establishments in California
Sureños
Latino street gangs
Gangs in Los Angeles
Mexican-American culture in Los Angeles
Boyle Heights, Los Angeles